Monaco competed at the 2002 Winter Olympics in Salt Lake City, Utah, United States.

Bobsleigh

Men

References
Official Olympic Reports
 Olympic Winter Games 2002, full results by sports-reference.com

Nations at the 2002 Winter Olympics
2002 Winter Olympics
Winter Olympics